A catalogue raisonné (or critical catalogue) is a comprehensive, annotated listing of all the known artworks by an artist either in a particular medium or all media. The works are described in such a way that they may be reliably identified by third parties, and such listings play an important role in authentification.

Etymology
The term catalogue raisonné is French, meaning "reasoned catalogue" (i.e. containing arguments for the information given, such as attributions), but is part of the technical terminology of the English-speaking art world. The spelling is never Americanized to "catalog", even in the United States. The French pluralization catalogues raisonnés is used.

Description
There are many variations, both broader and narrower than "all the works" or "one artist". The parameters may be restricted to one type of artwork by one artist or widened to all the works by a group of artists.

It can take many years to complete a catalogue raisonné, and large teams of researchers are sometimes employed on the task. For example, about 25 people reportedly contributed over 11 years to the three-volume catalogue raisonné for abstract-expressionist painter Robert Motherwell, an effort organized by the Dedalus Foundation and published by Yale University Press in 2012.

Early examples consisted of two distinct parts: a biography and the catalogue itself. Their modern counterpart is the critical catalogue, which may contain personal views of the author.

Role in authentication
The New York Times has described catalogues raisonnés as the definitive, scholarly compendia of an artist's work, the "supreme arbiter of the genuine and fake". In the case of deceased artists the producer of a catalogue raisonné which is regarded as a standard text may have considerable power to determine whether a particular work is regarded as authentic or not. In this context "producers" may include authors, editors, committees or publishers.

Inclusion in or exclusion from a respected catalogue raisonné can have a considerable effect on the market price of a work, amounting in some cases to large sums of money. Inclusion has been called the difference between "great wealth and the gutter", and auction houses sometimes refuse to handle unlisted works. As a result, catalogue raisonné authors have been the targets of lawsuits, and allegedly of bribes and even death threats although no evidence of the latter has reached the courts.

Difficulties can occur when more than one catalogue raisonné is published for the same oeuvre. The work of the artist Amedeo Modigliani is the subject of at least five catalogues raisonnés.

In 2012, the New York Times reported that some scholars and artists' foundations have decided not to publish future catalogues raisonnés because they fear being sued by buyers or sellers unhappy with their conclusions. The question of whether producers of catalogues raisonnés should accept responsibility for determining the authenticity of works was debated at a seminar on 29 March 2012 held at Christie's, New York under the auspices of the Catalogue Raisonné Scholars Association.

Wildenstein example

An example of individual policies is given by the Wildenstein Institute's stated policy with regard to the authentication of artworks which (at 8 February 2014) was as follows: 'After examination, and based on the opinion of the members of the committee, a recommendation is made in the form of the intention to include or not to include the work under study; a third possibility also exists, that of continuing the examination of the work. Under no circumstance is a recommendation to be considered as a certificate of authenticity or appraisal, and no justification will be provided for said recommendation.' This policy contrasts with the text of the letter from the Institute which was read out on the first-ever episode of the 2011 British television series, Fake or Fortune?: 

 In the first-ever episode of Fake or Fortune?, broadcast in 2011, the subject was the authenticity of the Claude Monet  painting Bords de la Seine à Argenteuil. The painting was submitted to the Wildenstein Institute which is the publisher of the catalogues raisonnés most widely accepted as authoritative on the subject of Monet paintings. The result of this submission was that the Institute, acting in accordance with the wishes of a descendant of the original author of the catalogues, refused to include it in future editions. This decision was taken despite the fact that the Institute had been presented with considerable evidence of the painting's authenticity.

 In contrast to this decision, episode one series 3 of the programme, broadcast in 2014, investigated one of a group of paintings reputedly by French post-impressionist Édouard Vuillard and on this occasion, a committee of the Wildenstein Institute decided that the painting should be included in their catalogue raisonné for the artist. The art dealer and historian Philip Mould stated while presenting the programme that this painting would be worth approximately £250,000 if it was accepted for inclusion in the catalogue raisonné, but that if it was not accepted it would be worth approximately £1,500 'as a piece of decorative art' – less than 1% of the full value.

Destruction of fake paintings
Even if there is no published catalogue raisonné for an artist, there may be an organization that publishes authentications which are regarded as having the same effect as a formal catalogue. In episode 3 series 3 in the UK television series, Fake or Fortune? the subject was a painting that bore a signature reading "Marc Chagall". It had been included in a reference work on the painter, but not in the most recent edition of that work, and forensic tests showed that it was painted with pigments not available at the time it was purported to have been executed. Despite this uncertain evidence of authenticity, the makers of the programme submitted it to a group referred to as the "Chagall Committee", which includes descendants of the artist. This committee ruled that the painting is a fake and sought its destruction either with the agreement of the owner or, failing that, by court order under the French law of Droit moral. 

The art historian Dr Bendor Grosvenor criticised the Chagall Committee's decision to seek the destruction of the painting, which contrasts with the policy of the Wildenstein Institute when works are submitted to it: 'Whatever the committee's recommendation, the work will be returned upon presentation of the consignment receipt'. Presenter and art dealer Philip Mould said "I would now [think] three times or more before sending it to Paris. Ugly acts like the one proposed by the Committee can have the effect of damaging the progress of art history."

Notes

References

Further reading
 Art Books: A Basic Bibliography of Monographs on Artists (Garland Reference Library of the Humanities) by W. Freitag; Publisher: Routledge; Second Edition (April 1, 1997)
Judging the Authenticity of Prints by The Masters: A Primer for Collectors by David Rudd Cycleback

External links
 The Catalogue Raisonné Scholars Association
 The International Foundation for Art Research's database of catalogues raisonnés
 Authentication in Art 2014 Guidelines on Catalogues Raisonnés

Art history
Monographs
Books by type
Museum books